Trachypepla festiva is a moth of the family Oecophoridae and was first described by Alfred Philpott in 1930. It is endemic to New Zealand and has been collected in the northern parts of the North Island.

Taxonomy 
This species was first described by Alfred Philpott in 1930. In 1939 George Hudson discussed and illustrated T. festiva in his book A supplement to the butterflies and moths of New Zealand. Hudson also synonymised T. polyleuca with this species. The male holotype, collected by C. E. Clarke at Whangārei Falls, is held at the Auckland War Memorial Museum. It has been hypothesised that this species is possibly a form of T. conspiculella.

Description

This species was described by Philpott as follows:

The adults of this species imitates bird droppings but it differs from other species in its genus as it has detailed markings on the forewings.

Distribution
This species is endemic to New Zealand and has been collected in Leigh, North Auckland, and Whangārei.

Behaviour 
Adults of this species are on the wing from November until January.

References 

Moths described in 1930
Oecophoridae
Taxa named by Alfred Philpott
Moths of New Zealand
Endemic fauna of New Zealand
Endemic moths of New Zealand